Mavesyn Ridware is a civil parish in the district of Lichfield, Staffordshire, England.  It contains 24 listed buildings that are recorded in the National Heritage List for England.  Of these, two are at Grade I, the highest of the three grades, three are at Grade II*, the middle grade, and the others are at Grade II, the lowest grade.  The parish contains the villages of Hill Ridware and Mavesyn Ridware and smaller settlements, and the surrounding countryside.  Most of the listed buildings are houses, cottages, farmhouses and farm buildings, the earlier of which are timber framed, some with cruck construction.  The other listed buildings include a church and a memorial in the churchyard, larger houses with associated structures, including a gatehouse, and a bridge.


Key

Buildings

References

Citations

Sources

Lists of listed buildings in Staffordshire